Ginossar (also spelled Ginosar) is a kibbutz in northern Israel.

Ginossar may also refer to:

 Rosa Ginossar (1890-1979), first female lawyer in Israel and women's rights activist
Shlomo Ginossar (1889-1969), Israeli ambassador to Italy
 Eldad Ginossar (born 1981), Israeli bridge player